Whitetail Mountain Resort is a four-season resort located on Two Top Mountain, a mountain in the Bear Pond Mountains of Pennsylvania. The resort opened for skiing in 1991, and was acquired a few years later by Snow Time, Inc., the company which also manages Liberty Mountain Resort and Ski Roundtop. All three resorts (Whitetail, Liberty and Roundtop) were then acquired by Peak Resorts in 2018. Peak Resorts was then acquired by Vail Resorts in 2019.

Whitetail is located between Mercersburg, Pennsylvania and Clear Spring, Maryland and serves the Baltimore-Washington Metropolitan Area. The resort operates a snow tubing park alongside the ski hill. During non-ski season, Whitetail offers fly fishing and a par 72 golf course.

The mountain
Whitetail Resort's trail system was specifically designed to separate skiers of different skiing abilities.  Separate first time, easier, intermediate and most difficult areas are lined up in sequence across the mountain, each fed by a different lift system, with trails connecting each area to its neighbors. Whitetail's trails are a series of straight parallels noted for the steady, sustained pitch of their vertical drop.  The resort's design was noted by Snow Country Magazine, which gave its 1992 Best Overall Resort Design Award to Whitetail, and by Skiing Magazine, which recognized the resort for environmental excellence in area design.

Trails
Whitetail possesses slopes with varying levels of difficulty. The trail names are as follows:

 Easier Trails: Almost Home, Launching Pad, Northern Lights, Sidewinder, Snowpark, Velvet

 More Difficult Trails: Upper Angel Drop, Lower Angel Drop, Bob Small's Traverse, Drop Out, Fallmount, Fanciful, Home Run, Limelight, Ridge Runner, Snow Dancer, Stalker

  Most Difficult Trails: Drop In, Exhibition, Farside

 Extremely Difficult Trails:  Bold Decision

Terrain Parks: Half Pipe, Jib Junction, Park Place 101

Statistics
Base Elevation: 
Summit: 
Vertical Rise: 
Average annual snowfall: 40 in/year (1 m/year).
Number of Trails: 25 (2 terrain parks and a half pipe)
Slope Difficulty: 28% beginner, 44% intermediate, 16% advanced, 12% Terrain Park
Longest Run: Limelight ~ 4,900 feet (1494 m)
Snowmaking: 100%
Night Skiing: 100%
Skiing Season: December to mid-March (weather dependent)

Ski Season 
Whitetail Resort usually has a short to medium ski season. This is because of its position in the transition of a Humid Subtropical climate, and a Temperate climate. The number of days in the season usually ranges from 80 to 100 days, with some seasons being shorter, and some being longer. Whitetail usually gets crowded on weekends, and holidays, while weekdays are usually less busy. Snow Conditions are usually great up until early March, where the tilt of the Sun melts the snow during the day, and it freezes at night. The notable 2017-18 North American winter boosted Whitetails sales and extended the ski season until late-March. Unlike the year before, Whitetail managed to have 108 days in its ski season.

External links 
 
Whitetail Golf Resort
Dusty Wissmath's Fly Fishing School

References 

Ski areas and resorts in Pennsylvania
Buildings and structures in Franklin County, Pennsylvania
Tourist attractions in Franklin County, Pennsylvania
Peak Resorts